Tanja Softić is a Bosnian-American visual artist and art educator who works in media of drawing, printmaking, painting and photography. She is Professor of Art Practice in the Department of Art and Art History at the University of Richmond.

Personal life and career 

Tanja Softić was born In 1966 in Sarajevo, former Yugoslavia, present-day Bosnia and Herzegovina. She attended the Academy of Fine Arts of the University of Sarajevo and Old Dominion University.

In 1992, Softić accepted the position of Assistant Professor of Art at Rollins College in Winter Park, Florida.  In the following three years, she worked on printed and mixed-media books and large-scale drawings, all greatly influenced by following the disintegration of Yugoslavia and war in Bosnia, As her own outward identity was shifting from displaced Yugoslav to exiled Bosnian to U.S. immigrant, this series of books, prints and drawings addressed the deliberate destruction of cultural memory: the attacks on historic monuments and other material culture during that war, most notably the incineration of the National and University Library of Bosnia and Herzegovina in Sarajevo in August 1993. Returning to Sarajevo in 1996, seven months after signing of the Dayton Peace Accord, she witnessed the early stages of the city's physical reconstitution and the rehabilitation of its citizens' lives. This experience profoundly influenced her work:  she developed new narrative and compositional methods that were influenced by the deconstructive and constructive forces of war, loss, fragmentation, and reconstruction. Her prints and drawings from this period were based on forms of seeds, crustaceans' shells and human and animal skeletal elements—metaphors for loss, survival and preservation. During the sabbatical in 1988–99, while conducting research for a public commission for the University of South Florida, she became intrigued by various concepts of memory in the mythology and literature of ancient Greece and Rome and the late Middle Ages. Of particular interest, was the method of speech memorization of Roman orators described by Cicero and the anonymous author of Ad Herrenium. Using this method, the speaker was trained to visualize delivery of a speech as a walk through a large building with many rooms around an atrium. Walking from room to room, the speaker claimed memorized ideas from the "loci", or memory triggers arranged carefully in each room (c.f. Frances B. Yates, The Art of Memory. The concept of creating a virtual interior space as a complex receptacle of memory, meaning, and images in the mnemonic process became relevant to her drawings, prints, and installations. Memory Folios, a series of six mural-sized drawings completed between 1998 and 2001.

In 2000, Softić joined the Department of Art and Art History at the University of Richmond, where she is currently the Professor of Art. In the next twelve years, she has continued to develop work that addressed the relationships between images and processes of memory. In 2004–2005, Softić organized a year-long series of events at the University of Richmond titled Art, Hybridity and Contemporary Cosmopolitanism, which brought to campus artists and scholars like Homi Bhabha, Coco Fusco, Zarina and works by artists Rina Banerjee, Ellen Galagher, Wangechi Mutu and Mona Hatoum.

From 2007 to 2012, Softić worked on a series of large works on paper, Migrant Universe, her most extensive body of work to date; an expansive visual poem about immigrant's identity and worldview: exile, longing, translation, and memory. This work poses questions of cultural identity or cultural belonging on an intellectual level while suggesting actual internal experience of what Edward Said called "the contrapuntal reality [of an exile]". At the same time, she served as a Chair of the Department of Art and Art History from 2009 to 2012.

During a 2013–2014 sabbatical from University of Richmond, Softić spent time in Sarajevo, photographing, researching, and interviewing staff at several cultural institutions that were either closed for lack of government funding or that operated under difficult conditions. She worked in the National Museum of Bosnia and Herzegovina, the National and University Library, the Museum of Literature and Performing Arts and the Museum of History, all suffering from wartime destruction and damage, by the exodus of professionals during the war, and by the lack of cultural support by the divided Bosnian government. This sojourn led to a photo-essay, Catalogue of Silence. In fall 2015, Softić organized a series of events, 20 Years After Srebrenica: Bosnia and Herzegovina Today at the University of Richmond, that commemorated anniversaries of both Srebrenica massacre and 1995 Dayton Peace Accords and brought to campus documentary filmmakers, poets, artists scholars and graphic designers from Bosnia and neighboring countries for a series of exhibitions, panel discussions, screenings and performances.

Selected bibliography 

Shapiro, Gary,  "Landscapes of Memory:  Tanja Softić's Migrant Universe", catalog essay for Migrant Universe exhibition, Halsey Institute for Contemporary Art, College of Charleston, 2011.

Leiby, Jeanne, "Tanja Softic´", Southern Review,  Baton Rouge, Louisiana, Spring 2009.

Ryan, Dinah, "Tanja Softic´ and Holly Morrison at Page Bond Gallery", Art Papers, 	Atlanta, Georgia, Vol 33, #2, March–April issue, 2009.

Wurster, Lisa, "Artist in Exile",   Artist Magazine, Cincinnati, Ohio, January/ February issue, 2009.

Dawson, Jessica, "You are Here, Here and Here," The Washington Post, Washington, D.C. May 13, 2004.

Brickman, David, "Dream Logic," Metroland, Albany, New York, November 13, 2003.

Temin, Christine, "Two Striking Exhibits Show the Power of Prints," The Boston Globe, Boston, Massachusetts, March 9, 2003.

Kinder, Elizabeth, "Bradley's Prime Prints," Peoria Journal-Star, Peoria, Illinois, March 5, 2003.

Nakabayoshi, Tadayoshi, "Exhibition Report: The 5th Kochi International Triennial Exhibition of Prints," TAMA Art Journal, Tokyo, Japan, March 2002.

McLeod, Deborah, "Tanja Softic at the Marsh Gallery," Art Papers, Atlanta, Georgia, Vol 25, #3, May–June issue, page 42, 2001.

Schlegel, Amy Ingrid, "You Can't Go Home Again:  The Art of Exile," NY Arts—International Edition, Volume 5, No. 2, 2000.

Michael O'Sullivan, "Ten Best Shows of 1999," The Washington Post, Washington, D.C., December 24, 1999.

Allen, Lynne and McGibbon, Phyllis, The Best of Printmaking, Rockport Publishers Inc, 1998, Quarry Books, Gloucester, Massachusetts.

Cullum, Jerry, Southern Arts Federation/National Endowment for the Arts 1996 Visual Artist Fellowship Catalog, Southern Arts Federation, Atlanta, Georgia.

Stewart, Laura.  "Tanja Softic´ at the Cornell Fine Arts Museum," Art Papers, January 1995.

McGreevy, Linda.  "Tanja Softic and the Dread of History," The SECAC Review, 1994.

References

 Prva Gimnazija
 Academy of Fine Arts University of Sarajevo
 Old Dominion University
 K. Caraccio Printing Studio
 Rollins College Department of Art and Art History
 University of Richmond Department of Art and Art History 
 Migrant Universe

1966 births
Living people
University of Richmond faculty
Artists from Sarajevo
Old Dominion University alumni
Yugoslav emigrants to the United States
University of Sarajevo alumni
Artists from Richmond, Virginia
American women printmakers
21st-century American women artists
American women academics